Talal Al-Shamali (born 4 March 1990) is a Saudi football player. He currently plays for Al-Hedaya as a winger .

References
http://www.slstat.com/spl2011-2012ar/player.php?id=184

1991 births
Living people
Saudi Arabian footballers
Saudi Arabian expatriate footballers
Saudi Arabian expatriate sportspeople in Kuwait
Kuwait SC players
Al-Qadsiah FC players
Al-Nahda Club (Saudi Arabia) players
Al-Tai FC players
Al-Raed FC players
Najran SC players
Al-Jubail Club players
Al-Hedaya Club players
Saudi First Division League players
Saudi Professional League players
Saudi Second Division players
Saudi Fourth Division players
Saudi Third Division players
Association football wingers